Turkey Beach is a coastal town and locality in the Gladstone Region, Queensland, Australia.

Geography 
Turkey Beach is a coastal fishing village that sits in the protected Rodds Bay., and one of the geographically closest places to the Great Barrier Reef.

The area features large areas of mangrove inlets, creeks, and estuaries that provide excellent fishing and some of the best mud crabbing areas in Queensland. The Eurimbula National Park preserves the rugged peninsular between the bay and the Coral Sea where Rodds Bay is home to a variety of marine and bird life. Nearby Pancake Creek is a wilderness park located in the lee of Bustard Head providing a popular anchorage for yachts and boats.

Turkey Beach also has a small tidal swimming enclosure near the boat ramp and an extensive network of sandy beaches outside Rodds Harbour offers beachgoers plenty of choices.

History 
The town was gazetted on 1 November 1968. The name Turkey relates directly back to the bustard or  bush turkey shot by Captain Cook's crew back in 1770 when they discovered the area aboard . Nearby Turkey Station existed since at latest 1875.

Turkey Beach was within the Shire of Miriamvale until the shire was amalgamated into the Gladstone Region in 2008.

Amenities 
The town of Turkey Beach has good amenities. Accommodation is available, but there is no camping in the township. Turkey Beach has good links with the towns of  1770 and Agnes Water, the tourist hubs of the Discovery Coast.

Education 
There are no schools in Turkey Beach. The nearest government primary school is Bororen State School. The nearest government secondary schools are Miriam Vale State School (offering secondary schooling  to Year 10) and Tannum Sands State High School (offering secondary schooling to Year 12).

Getting there
Access to Turkey Beach is from the Bruce Highway. The  road leading into Turkey Beach is bitumen.

See also

References

External links
 Town map of Turkey Beach, 1980
Turkey Beach
1770 Let's Connect Turkey Beach
Bundaberg Coast: Turkey Beach, Bororen & Miriam Vale
 Town of Bororen
 Discovery Coast Tourism Commission
 Town of 1770

Towns in Queensland
Gladstone Region
Coastline of Queensland
Localities in Queensland